This is a list of members of the 56th Legislative Assembly of Queensland from 2017 to 2020, as elected at the 2017 election held on 25 November 2017.

The LNP member for Whitsunday, Jason Costigan, was expelled from the party on 1 February 2019. He sat as an independent until forming North Queensland First on 31 October 2019.
The LNP member for Currumbin, Jann Stuckey, resigned on 1 February 2020. LNP candidate Laura Gerber was elected as her replacement at a by-election on 28 March 2020.
The Labor member for Bundamba, Jo-Ann Miller, resigned on 20 February 2020. Labor candidate Lance McCallum was elected as her replacement at a by-election on 28 March 2020.

References

Members of Queensland parliaments by term
21st-century Australian politicians